Mstsislaw District (Mstislavsky raion) is a raion (district) in Mogilev Region, Belarus, the administrative center is the town of Mstsislaw. As of 2009, its population was 24,768. Population of Mstsislaw accounts for 43.6% of the district's population.

Notable residents 

 Maksim Harecki (1893 – 1938), Belarusian writer, journalist, activist of the Belarusian independence movement and victim of Soviet repressions

References

 
Districts of Mogilev Region